Bella Donna is a 1983 West German drama film directed by Peter Keglevic. It was screened in the Un Certain Regard section at the 1983 Cannes Film Festival.

Cast
 Harry Baer
 Angela Göckel as Maria
 Brigitte Horney as Jutta
 Krystyna Janda as Lena
 Erland Josephson as Max
 Peter Kern
 Friedrich Karl Praetorius as Fritz
 Kurt Raab
 Ilse Ritter

References

External links

1983 films
1983 drama films
1980s German-language films
German drama films
West German films
Films directed by Peter Keglevic
1980s German films